Anceschi is an Italian surname. Notable people with the surname include:

 Adelaide Anceschi (born 1839), Italian-born, Malta-based photographer
Luciano Anceschi (1911–1995), Italian literary critic and essayist
Stefano Anceschi (born 1984), Italian sprinter

Italian-language surnames